Paulchoffatia is a genus of extinct mammal of the Upper Jurassic - Lower Cretaceous. It was a relatively early member of the also extinct order Multituberculata, within the suborder "Plagiaulacida" and family Paulchoffatiidae. It lived in Europe during the "age of the dinosaurs."

The genus Paulchoffatia ("for Paul Choffat") was named by Kühne W.G. in 1961 based on a single species. It is also known as Paulchoffia. Paulchoffatia is characterized by a massive Corpus mandibulae (the part of the jaw below the tooth row), a rounded lower margin of the jaw and a massive, only slightly curved and steeply inclined incisor with a short root", (Hahn & Hahn 2000, p. 105). The name honours the geologist Paul Choffat (1849–1919).

Remains of the species Paulchoffatia delgadoi were found in the Kimmeridgian (Upper Jurassic)-age strata of Guimarota, Portugal. The skull probably had a length of 2.5 cm. This taxon is based on five lower jaw fossils. Further material of this genus, though very possibly not this species, has been reported from the Lower Cretaceous location of Galve, Spain.

References
 Kühne (1961), Eine Mammaliafauna aus dem Kimmeridge Portugals. Neues Jahrbuch für Geologie und Paläontologie, Monatshefte, 1961, p. 374-381. (A mammalian fauna from the Kimmeridgian of Portugal.)
 Hahn G & Hahn R (2000), Multituberculates from the Guimarota mine, p. 97-107 in Martin T & Krebs B (eds), Guimarota - A Jurassic Ecosystem, Verlag Dr Friedrich Pfeil, München.
 Kielan-Jaworowska Z & Hurum JH (2001), "Phylogeny and Systematics of multituberculate mammals". Paleontology 44, p. 389-429.
 Much of this information has been derived from  Multituberculata (Cope 1884).

Multituberculates
Cretaceous mammals
Jurassic mammals
Extinct mammals of Europe
Taxa named by Walter Georg Kühne
Prehistoric mammal genera